Noël-Antoine Pluche (13 November 1688 – 19 November 1761), known as the abbé Pluche, was a French priest. He is now known for his Spectacle de la nature, a most popular work of natural history.

Biography 
Pluche, son of a baker, was born in Reims, in a street now named after him. He became a teacher of rhetoric. The Bishop of Laon made him head of the town's college, a post he accepted to escape judicial consequences of opposing the papal bull Unigenitus (1713)

He withdrew in 1749 to La Varenne-Saint-Maur, near Paris, where he died.

His Spectacle de la nature, ou Entretiens sur les particularités de l'Histoire naturelle qui ont paru les plus propres à rendre les jeunes gens curieux et à leur former l'esprit was published in nine volumes 1732–1742, and widely translated all over Europe. Although it influenced many to become naturalists, it was a work of popularization, not of science.

Works

 Histoire du ciel considéré selon les idées des poètes, des philosophes et de Moïse, où l'on fait voir : 1° l'origine du ciel poétique, 2° la méprise des philosophes sur la fabrique du ciel et de la terre, 3° la conformité de l'expérience avec la seule physique de Moïse (1739)
 
 
 
 
 
 De Linguarum artificio et doctrina (1751)
 Concorde de la géographie des différens âges (1764)
 Lettre sur la sainte ampoule et sur le sacre de nos Rois à Reims. (1775)

Sources 
levieremoise.free.fr

External links
 Portrait
  Le Spectacle de la Nature, Tome quatrième, Paris 1732, edizione del 1764  da www.atlascoelestis.com

1688 births
1761 deaths
Clergy from Reims
French naturalists
French male writers